Menko Bormanzhinov (1855 – 1919) was a Buddhist priest of Kalmyk origin who was born in the Bokshirgankan aimak in the Salsk District of the Don Cossack Host sometime in 1855.

Lama Bormanzhinov was born to Bakar and Djindeng Bormanzhinov in the year of the wood-hare. At age 12 in 1867, he began studying to become a monk under Lama Djimba Gandjinov. After the death of Lama Gandjinov in 1869, Lama Bormanzhinov studies in the Bolshederbotovskii ulus under the guidance of Lama Sandji Yavanov, the Ochir Lama.

In 1883, Lama Bormanzhinov became Baksha of his native khurul. He remained in that position until 1903, when he was elected Lama of the Don Kalmyks - the spiritual leader of the Kalmyk community in the Salsk District of the Don Cossack Host.

Lama Bormanzhinov was noted for promoting public education among the Don Kalmyks. He also followed Ochir Lama and Lama Arkad Chubanov in publishing the lunar calendar. Moreover, both he and Lama Lubsan Sharab Tepkin were responsible for the publication of at least 12 titles of sacred Buddhist text in the Kalmyk language.

Lama Bormanzhinov died of typhus in April 1919 after returning to his native aimak from a refugee camp in the Kuban, where he fled persecution from the Bolsheviks. He was succeeded as Lama of the Don Kalmyks by Shurguchi Nimgirov, the Baksha of the khurul in the Bayuda aimak.

References
Balinov, Shamba. Genocide in the USSR, Chapter V, Attempted Destruction of Other Religious Groups, The Kalmyk Buddhists, Nikolai Dekker and Andrei Lebed, Editors, Series I, No. 40, Institute for the Study of the USSR, Munich, 1958.
Bormanshinov, Arash. Lama Arkad Chubanov, His Predecessors and Successors, Birchbark Press, College Park, MD 1980.
Bormanshinov, Arash. THE LAMAS OF THE KALMYK PEOPLE: THE DON KALMYK LAMAS, Papers on Inner Asia, No. 18, Research Institute for Inner Asian Studies, Indiana University, Bloomington, 1991.
Poppe, Nicholas N. Genocide in the USSR, Chapter V, Attempted Destruction of Other Religious Groups, The Buddhists, Nikolai Dekker and Andrei Lebed, Editors, Series I, No. 40, Institute for the Study of the USSR, Munich, 1958.

Tibetan Buddhist priests from Kalmykia
1855 births
1919 deaths
Buddhists from the Russian Empire